Arsenie is a male given name. It may refer to:

Arsenie Boca (1910—1989), Romanian Orthodox monk, theologian and artist
Arsenie Todiraș (born 1983), Moldovan singer and member of boyband O-Zone. Also a solo singer in Romania known by his mononym Arsenie or sometimes as Arsenium

See also
 Arsenius (name)
Arseniev or Arsenyev, a town in Primorsky Krai, Russia